Toto Landero (20 October 1995 – 4 July 2022) was a Filipino professional boxer who challenged for the WBA minimumweight title in 2018.

Professional boxing career
Landero has challenged for two minimumweight world titles in 2018; firstly the WBA title in March, where he lost to Knockout CP Freshmart by unanimous decision. Simphiwe Khonco then defeated Landero in July via the same result to retain his IBO title.

Professional boxing record

References

External links
 

1995 births
2022 deaths
Filipino male boxers
Mini-flyweight boxers
Light-flyweight boxers
Boxers from Negros Occidental
Deaths by drowning
21st-century Filipino people